Falco has been the name of at least three ships of the Italian Navy and may refer to:

 , a torpedo boat launched in 1888. 
 , an  ordered by Romania in 1913 as Viscol but she was not laid down before the order was taken over by Italy in 1915 and renamed.  Transferred to Spain in 1939 as Ceuta.
 , previously the passenger liner . Conversion started in 1942 with the name Falco and then renamed Sparviero but the conversion was never finished. She was seized by Germany in 1943 and scuttled in 1944.

Italian Navy ship names